Birdseye, Birds Eye or Bird's Eye may refer to:

Art and media
Birdseye (film), a 2002 film starring Fred Ward
Birdseye (Tony Rich album), 1998 album by Tony Rich
Bird's-eye view, a view of an object from above, as though the observer were a bird
From a Bird's Eye View, a 1971 United States sitcom about two airline stewardesses
Birdseye, colloquialism for fermata, a symbol used in musical notation

Places
Birdseye, Indiana, United States
Birdseye, Utah, United States
Birdseye Highway, South Australia, named for Sylvia Birdseye

Flora

Chili peppers
Bird's eye chili, a cultivar of the species Capsicum annuum, commonly found in Southeast Asia
Bird's eye, or Capsicum annuum var. glabriusculum, native to southern North America and northern South America
African bird's eye chili, also known as piri piri, a cultivar of Capsicum frutescens
Filipino bird's eye, another name for siling labuyo, a cultivar of Capsicum frutescens native to the Philippines

Other flora
Bird's eye, or Bird's-eye Speedwell, another name for the plant Veronica chamaedrys

Surname
Clarence Birdseye (1886–1956), considered the founder of the modern frozen food industry, and the "Birds Eye" frozen food brand
Sylvia Birdseye (1902–1962), first woman to hold a commercial bus driving licence in South Australia
Tom Birdseye (born 1951), American children's author

Other
Birds Eye, a multinational frozen foods company
Captain Birdseye, also known as Captain Iglo, the advertising mascot for the Birds Eye frozen food brand
 Birdseye cloth, frequently used in diapers
Birdseye maple, a pattern in certain kinds of timber
Bird's eye maple (mineral property), an effect observed in mica and other crystals